Yamaha Y125Z or better known as Yamaha Z (in Europe) is a 125 cc two-stroke moped or underbone motorcycle produced by Yamaha. Debuted in 1998 as a successor of Yamaha Y110SS, the Y125Z was the first two-stroke underbone motorcycle with a catalytic converter.  Beside being sold in most Southeast Asian countries especially in Malaysia and Singapore, it was also sold in Greece. The production of the Y125Z ended in 2017 after being sold for more than two decades.

Yamaha Y125Z in motorsports
The Yamaha Y125Z is widely used in motorcycle racing tournaments held in Malaysia or Asean level. In Malaysia, the Y125Z is formerly used in the Expert category of Malaysian Cub Prix tournament series.

Notes

Y125Z
Two-stroke motorcycles